The USCGC Mariposa (WLB-397) was an  belonging to the United States Coast Guard launched on 14 January 1944 and commissioned on 1 July 1944.

Design
The Iris-class buoy tenders were constructed after the Mesquite-class buoy tenders. She was powered by one electric motor. This was connected up to two Westinghouse generators which were driven by two CooperBessemer GND-8 four-cycle diesel engines. She had a single screw.

The ships had a complement of six officers and seventy-four crew members in 1945; this decreased to two warrants, four officers, and forty-seven men in 1966. They were fitted with a SL1 radar system and QBE-3A sonar system in 1945. Their armament consisted of one 3"/50 caliber gun, two 20 mm/80 guns, two Mousetraps, two depth charge tracks, and four Y-guns in 1945; these were removed in 1966.

Career 

Upon receiving her commission Mariposa was assigned to the 3rd  Coast Guard District and homeported in Staten Island where she was used for general ATON until the end of World War II. After the end of the war, she stayed in Staten Island. In 1990, she underwent a major renovation and from June 1991, until being decommissioned, she was stationed in Seattle.

In 2000, she was transferred to the U.S. Navy for use as a training hulk.

See also
 List of United States Coast Guard cutters

References

External links

Historic American Engineering Record in Washington (state)
Iris-class seagoing buoy tenders
1944 ships
Ships built in Duluth, Minnesota